The Home Park, previously known as the Little Park (and originally Lydecroft Park), is a private  Royal park, administered by the Crown Estate. It lies on the eastern side of Windsor Castle in the town and former civil parish of Windsor in the English county of Berkshire. To its south is Windsor Great Park.

Home Park is listed Grade I on the Register of Historic Parks and Gardens of Historic England.

Features
The Home Park is divided from the main Windsor Great Park by the high-volume Albert Road (A308) to Old Windsor. It is the private estate of the castle and, as well as beautiful parkland, gardens and avenues of fine trees, contains much farmland (cattle grazing and winter feed), a golf course, a bowling green (for the Royal Household Bowling Club), a cricket field (for the Royal Household Cricket Club), tennis courts (Windsor Home Park Lawn Tennis Club), the playing fields of St. George's School, Adelaide Cottage (on the site of the old Keeper's Lodge) and the Frogmore Estate, including Frogmore House, and gardens with Frogmore Cottage and a large lake, the Royal Mausolea and the Royal Burial Ground. Also attached are Shaw Farm, the Former Prince Consort's Home Farm and the Windsor Farm Shop. The grave of Dash, the favourite spaniel of Queen Victoria, can be found on the grounds.

History
Originally in the manor of Orton and not a royal possession, part of the area was first emparked (for deer hunting) by King Edward III in 1368 and expansion continued over many centuries. Areas of the Home Park are mentioned in Shakespeare's Merry Wives of Windsor and show that the main road to Datchet then ran through it. The famous Herne's Oak stood nearby. Oliver Cromwell trained his New Model Army in the park. George III removed the deer in 1785.

The modern boundaries of the park were set by the Windsor Improvement Act 1846 and the Windsor Castle Act 1848 when the road to Datchet through the park was closed and public access denied.

Frogmore House and gardens alone are open on a few specific days in the spring and summer. The Royal Windsor Horse Show and the Windsor Rose Show also take place within the park.

References

External links
The Crown Estate
Windsor Home Park Lawn Tennis Club

 
Parks and open spaces in Berkshire
Crown Estate
Grade I listed parks and gardens in Berkshire